The 1885 Belmont Stakes was the 19th running of the Belmont Stakes, a race that would become the third leg of the U.S. Triple Crown series. Run on June 6, 1885, it was the 19th time the event was held at Jerome Park Racetrack in The Bronx, New York. The race drew six starters and was won easily by Tyrant who beat George L. Lorillard's runner-up St. Augustine by three lengths, with third place going to Preakness Stakes winner Tecumseh owned and trained by Charles Littlefield Sr. Heavily favored, Tyrant's winning time was 2:43 flat over a distance of 1½ miles on a dirt track which was rated as good.  The Breeder and Sportsman report on the race stated that "Tyrant won the race in the most easy manner possible."

Background to the big race
In 1884, the two-year-old Tyrant was conditioned for racing on the Rancho Del Paso's three-quarter mile training track but it was decided that the colt was not yet ready for the rigors of competition. As such, Tyrant only began his racing career as a three-year-old in 1885.

To be prepared and able to compete at racetracks in the New York City area, Tyrant and six other horses along with jockey Patsy Duffy and trainer William Claypool had traveled for 13 days from Rancho Del Paso Stud in Sacramento County, California. The New York racing community marveled at the excellent condition of the seven horses which had been shipped by rail transport in a boxcar specially built for Rancho Del Paso owner James Ben Ali Haggin.

Tyrant soon showed how good he was with a win in the important Withers Stakes at the Jerome Park track. As reported by the Breeder and Sportsman, Tyrant was trained by William Claypool and the win in the Withers Stakes marked the first time a California horse with a California trainer had won a major race for three-year-olds on the East Coast. About the Belmont Stakes, the Breeder and Sportsman wrote that "out of the original entry of sixty-two horses there were only six left in, most of them having been frightened by Tyrant's victory in the Withers."

Miss Palmer was the only filly in the field and was in last place shortly after the race began and remained there until the end. While the filly had won the Ladies Stakes on the same track as the Belmont, and had done it impressively, that was just seven days before the Belmont Stakes.

Results

 Winning Breeder: Belle Meade Stud (William Giles Harding)

References

External links 
 

Jerome Park Racetrack
Belmont Stakes races
Belmont Stakes
Belmont Stakes
Belmont Stakes
Jerome Park, Bronx
Horse races in New York City